John Simalenga was an Anglican bishop in Africa.

He was consecrated Assistant Bishop of South-West Tanganyika in 1963.

Notes

Anglican bishops of South-West Tanganyika
20th-century Anglican bishops in Tanzania